The John Innes Kane Cottage, also known as Breakwater and Atlantique, is a historic summer estate house at 45 Hancock Street in Bar Harbor, Maine.  Built in 1903-04 for John Innes Kane, a wealthy grandson of John Jacob Astor and designed by local architect Fred L. Savage, it is one of a small number of estate houses to escape Bar Harbor's devastating 1947 fire.  An imposing example of Tudor Revival architecture, it was listed on the National Register of Historic Places in 1992.

Description and history
The Kane Cottage is set on a nearly  parcel of land on a bluff overlooking Frenchman Bay, near the village of Bar Harbor.  It is a large -story structure, built of stone through the first floor, and of wood-frame construction finished in the half-timbered Tudor Revival style on the upper floors.  It is roughly L-shaped with a complex cross-gabled roof configuration.  Gable ends are typically decorated with vergeboard and pendants below the roofline and finials above, and the eaves of the roofline are flared.  The western facade presents the land-side entrance, which is set under a projecting gable-roofed portico supported by heavy wooden timbers.  The eastern facade faces the water, and is composed symmetrically, with outer cross gables flanking a porch area in the center.  A servant's wing extends west from the northern end of the building.

Although the exterior is clearly Tudor Revival in character, the interior has essentially Colonial Revival styling applied to a Tudor Revival layout.  The entry leads into a great hall, from which other living areas are accessed via stairs and hallways.  The great hall is lavishly decorated with Colonial Revival woodwork, including Tuscan columns, paneling, and crown molding.  Similar details, although less elaborate, are also found in the private spaces upstairs.  A parlor space lies on the ocean side south of the great hall, with a library behind.  The dining room is north of the great hall, with the giant hearth obscuring the entry into the butler's pantry, which connects the dining room to the kitchen spaces in the service wing.  The estate includes the original carriage house and caretaker's house, which were built at the same time as the main house.

The Kane Cottage was designed by local architect Fred L. Savage and built in 1903-04 for John Innes Kane, a wealthy socialite who was a great-grandson of John Jacob Astor.  It remained in the hands of Astor descendants until 1955, and deteriorated in condition in the later decades of the 20th century.  It has since been restored.

See also
National Register of Historic Places listings in Hancock County, Maine

References

Houses on the National Register of Historic Places in Maine
Tudor Revival architecture in Maine
Houses completed in 1904
Buildings and structures in Bar Harbor, Maine
National Register of Historic Places in Hancock County, Maine
Kane family